Sione Faletau (born 20 June 1988) is a Tonga rugby union player. His usual position is as a Prop, and he currently plays for Bristol Bears.	

Faletau  has previously played for Tonga and Yorkshire Carnegie. In March 2017 he was signed to Bristol.

References

External links
itsrugby.co.uk Profile

1988 births
Living people
Tongan rugby union players
Tonga international rugby union players
Rugby union props